United Progressive Alliance is an Indian political party coalition led by Indian National Congress.

Seat sharing summary
For the 2014 Indian general election, the UPA's is an alliance led for Indian National Congress with following parties:

Andhra Pradesh

Arunachal Pradesh

Assam

Bihar

Chhattisgarh

Goa

Gujarat

Haryana

Himachal Pradesh

Jammu and Kashmir

Jharkhand

Karnataka

Kerala

Madhya Pradesh

Maharashtra

Manipur

Meghalaya

Mizoram

Nagaland

Odisha

Punjab

Rajasthan

Sikkim

Tamil Nadu

Tripura

Uttar Pradesh

Uttarakhand

West Bengal

Constituencies by Union Territory

Andaman and Nicobar Islands

Chandigarh

Dadra and Nagar Haveli

Daman and Diu

Lakshadweep

NCT of Delhi

Puducherry

See also
 List of Constituencies of the Lok Sabha
 List of Left Democratic Front candidates in the 2014 Indian general election
 List of National Democratic Alliance candidates in the 2014 Indian general election
 List of West Bengal Left Front candidates in the 2014 Indian general election
 Indian National Congress campaign for the 2014 Indian general election

References

 
Lists of Indian political candidates
Indian National Congress